The trilling cisticola (Cisticola woosnami) is a species of bird in the family Cisticolidae.
It is found in Burundi, Democratic Republic of the Congo, Kenya, Malawi, Rwanda, Tanzania, Uganda, and Zambia.
Its natural habitats are dry savanna and subtropical or tropical dry lowland grassland.

References

trilling cisticola
Birds of Central Africa
Birds of East Africa
trilling cisticola
Taxonomy articles created by Polbot